Henri Luyten (1 August 1873, Koningshooikt, Belgium – 28 September 1954, Boechout, Belgium) was a Belgian champion racing cyclist who was a professional rider between 1895 and 1897.

Palmarès

1894
1st  Belgian National Road Race Championships - Amateur
5th World Track Championships, Stayers, Elite

1895
1st  Belgian National Road Race Championships
2nd World Track Championships, Stayers, Elite

1896
1st  Belgian National Road Race Championships
1st Rotterdam - Utrecht - Rotterdam

References

1873 births
1954 deaths
Belgian male cyclists
Cyclists from Antwerp Province
People from Lier, Belgium